The Blackbyrds are an American rhythm and blues and jazz-funk fusion group, formed in Washington, D.C., in 1973 and reformed in 2012 by Keith Killgo.

History
The group was inspired by trumpeter Donald Byrd and featured some of his Howard University students: Kevin Toney (keyboards), Keith Killgo (vocals, drums), Joe Hall (bass guitar), Allan Barnes (saxophone, clarinet), and Barney Perry (guitar). Orville Saunders (guitar), and Jay Jones (flute, saxophone) joined later. On "Rock Creek Park" and "Happy Music", Merry Clayton joined them on vocals. They signed to Fantasy Records in 1973. Their 1975 hit "Walking in Rhythm" received a Grammy nomination and sold over one million copies by May 1975. It was later awarded a gold disc.

Founding member Allan Barnes died on July 25, 2016, aged 66.

Sampling of Blackbyrds music
The Blackbyrds have influenced the hip-hop generation, with Tupac Shakur, Gang Starr, Da Lench Mob, and Full Force sampling their music. Their song "Happy Music" was issued on 45 rpm 12-inch single as the first club mix release by Fantasy Records, in November 1975, to enable club deejays to drop sequences into a mix. In particular, their 1975 song "Rock Creek Park" from the City Life album has been sampled numerous times by groups and artists such as MF Doom, De La Soul, Eric B. & Rakim, Big Daddy Kane, N.W.A, Massive Attack, Ice Cube, Heavy D, Nas and Grandmaster Flash & the Furious Five, Tone Lōc, Mac Dre, and Wiz Khalifa.

Discography

Studio albums

Compilations
1978: Night Grooves (Fantasy)
1989: Greatest Hits (Fantasy)
2007: Happy Music: The Best of The Blackbyrds (Fantasy FCD-30194-2)

Singles

References

External links

 D’Angelo, Enrico (June 2, 2003). "The Blackbyrds". The Harbus. Retrieved on October 27, 2007.

Musical groups from Washington, D.C.
American jazz ensembles
American soul musical groups
American funk musical groups
Fantasy Records artists